Alpha Piscium (α Piscium) is a binary star system in the equatorial constellation of Pisces.

The two components are designated Alpha Piscium A (officially named Alrescha, the traditional name of the system) and B.

Nomenclature

α Piscium (Latinised to Alpha Piscium) is the star's Bayer designation. The designations of the two components as Alpha Piscium A and B derive from the convention used by the Washington Multiplicity Catalog (WMC) for multiple star systems, and adopted by the International Astronomical Union (IAU).

The system bore the traditional name Alrescha (alternatively Al Rescha, Alrischa, Alrisha) derived from the Arabic الرشآء al-rishā’ "the cord" and less commonly Kaitain and Okda, the latter from the Arabic عقدة ʽuqdah "knot" (see Ukdah. In 2016, the International Astronomical Union organized a Working Group on Star Names (WGSN) to catalog and standardize proper names for stars. The WGSN approved the name Alrescha for the component Alpha Piscium A on 21 August 2016 and it is now so included in the List of IAU-approved Star Names.

Properties
Alpha Piscium comprises a close binary with angular separation of presently 1.8" between the components. The main star or primary (Alpha Piscium A) is of magnitude +4.33 and spectral type A0p, while the companion or secondary (Alpha Piscium B) is magnitude 5.23 and belongs to spectral class A3m. The two stars take more than 3,000 years to orbit one another and they will make their closest approach to each other around 2060. One or both of the stars may be a spectroscopic binary as well. The stars have masses of 2.55 and 2.64 solar masses respectively and shine with a total luminosity of 55 and 63 times that of the Sun.

Alpha Piscium is catalogued as an α2 Canum Venaticorum variable, a type of variable star where the brightness changes are caused by the rotation of the star.  The brightness varies by about 1/100th of a magnitude, identified from Hipparcos photometry.  The primary component is thought to be the source of the variations, and it has a period of 0.845 days which corresponds to the rotation period of the star.  Variations with a period of 6.65 days have also been identified in the variations.

Long-exposure observation
Stars that can set (not in a circumpolar constellation for the viewer) culminate at midnight – where viewed away from any polar region experiencing midnight sun – when at opposition, meaning they can be viewed from dusk until dawn. This applies to α Piscium on 21 October, in the current astronomical epoch. 

Half of the year from this date, 22 April, the star will be at conjunction above or below, the sun – apart by the star's declination (angle set out in table, right). The nearby days and months have most of the star's risen time during daylight.

References

Am stars
Alpha2 Canum Venaticorum variables
Double stars
Pisces (constellation)
Alrescha
Piscium, Alpha
BD+02 0317
Piscium, 113
012446 7
009487
0595 6